Thaluta maxmarrowi is a species of small sea snail, marine gastropod mollusk in the family Costellariidae, the ribbed miters.

References

 Cernohorsky W.O. (1980). New species of bathyal gastropods from Australia and New Zealand. Records of the Auckland Institute and Museum. 16: 105–108.
 Rosenberg G. & Callomon C. (2004 ["2003"]) Thaluta, a new genus of Costellariidae (Mollusca: Gastropoda), with description of a new species. Venus 62(3-4): 117-124.

Costellariidae
Gastropods described in 1980